Marc Culwick (sometimes credited as Mark Culwick) is a British-born actor whose most famous role was as Prince Albert Victor Christian Edward in the 1988 adaption of the Jack the Ripper legend starring Michael Caine.

External links
A Place in my Heart

British male television actors
British male film actors
Year of birth missing (living people)
Place of birth missing (living people)
Living people